Duncan Inglis may refer to:

Duncan James, Duncan Matthew James Inglis, British singer in the band Blue
Duncan Inglis Cameron of Heriot-Watt University, Edinburgh